Gigaductus is a genus of parasites in the phylum Apicomplexa.

Species in this genus infect Coleoptera (beetles) and Orthoptera (grasshoppers).

History

The first species of this genus was described by Crawley in 1903. These species were then moved to Gregarina in 1916 by Watson. Moriggi created the genus Endocryptella for them. Fillipponi created the family Gigaductidae and the genus Gigaductus for them in 1948.

Taxonomy

There are eleven species currently recognised in this genus.

The type species is Gigaductus anchi.

Lifecycle

The species in this family are spread by the oral-faecal route.

Development occurs in the epithelial cells of the gut or rarely in the Malpighian tubules.

The gamontocysts are enclosed in a thick gelatinous capsule.

Syzygy and encystment occur in the lumen of the gut (or tubule).

About 25-30 spores are generated from each gametocyst.

References

Apicomplexa genera
Parasites of insects